Yann Lesgourgues (born 17 January 1991) is a French rugby union footballer. He plays for Bordeaux Bègles.

He is a member of a young talented generation with Jean-Pascal Barraque and Jean-Marc Doussain. His usual position is scrum-half, although he can play as a centre.

External links
ERC statistics

1991 births
Living people
Biarritz Olympique players
Union Bordeaux Bègles players
French rugby union players
Sportspeople from Bayonne
French-Basque people
Rugby union scrum-halves